ZYH may refer to:

Zay Ye Htet, Burmese actor, model and producer
Den Haag Centraal railway station, The Hague, Netherlands, IATA code
Zhaoyuan County, Heilongjiang Province, China, division code